Kalyanasundaram Anbazhagan (19 December 1922 – 7 March 2020) was an Indian Tamil politician. He was a long-standing leader of the Dravidian movement and was the General Secretary of Dravida Munnetra Kazhagam party (DMK) for nine terms. He has held several cabinet ministerial portfolios in the Tamil Nadu government under  M. Karunanidhi including Finance, Education and Health and Social Welfare. He was elected as a member of the Tamil Nadu Legislative Assembly on nine occasions. He was earlier elected to the Lok Sabha the lower house of India's Parliament from Tiruchengode and was also a member of the Madras Legislative Council. He served as the opposition leader of Tamil Nadu assembly from 2001 to 2006. He was popularly referred to as Perasiriyar (Professor), though he was a lecturer in Tamil in Pachaiyappa's College before resigning to contest elections in 1957.

Early life
Anbazhagan was born in Kattoor near Thiruvarur in Tanjore district (now Thiruvarur District) of Madras Presidency, British India on 19 December 1922 to M. Kalyanasundaranar and Swarnambal as Ramaiah. He changed his name to Anbazhagan and being influenced by the Pure Tamil Movement led by Tamil scholar Maraimalai Adigal. In 1942, he addressed a Justice Party meeting in Thiruvarur as a student after being requested by C. N. Annadurai and came into contact with M. Karunanidhi for the first time.  He received his Master of Arts in  Tamil from Annamalai University and joined Pachaiyappa's College as a lecturer in Tamil in 1944.

Political career
Anbazhagan resigned as a Lecturer at Pachaiyappa's College to contest elections and was elected from Egmore to the Madras Legislative Assembly in 1957. He was a member of the Madras legislative council between 1962–1967 and a close confidant of the DMK founder C. N. Annadurai.   He was a member of Lok Sabha between 1967 and 1971. In 1971, he served as Social Welfare minister of Tamil Nadu. He had given up his M.L.A. position, representing Park Town constituency, in 1984 putting forward the Tamil Eelam issue. He was elected from Harbour constituency in 1996, 2001 and 2006. He served as the opposition leader of Tamil Nadu assembly from 2001 to 2006.

Personal life and death
Anbazhagan lived with his wife Santhakumari in Shanthi Colony, Anna Nagar, Chennai.

In his later years, Anbazhagan was in poor health, which minimized his political activities and public appearances, with the last one being on his 97th birthday on 19 December 2019.

On 24 February 2020, his health deteriorated and became "extremely critical and unstable", and he was admitted at Apollo Hospital in Chennai for treatment. He died there at 1:05 IST on 7 March 2020 due to complications of diabetes mellitus. The DMK declared a seven-day mourning after his death.

His grandson A. Vetriazhagan is the current MLA from Villivakkam constituency.

Literary works
Anbazhagan has sound knowledge of Tamil poetry. Some of his published works include:
Urimai vaazhvu
Viduthalaik kavignar
Pesum kalai valarpom
Thamizh kadal
Alai osai
Thamizhar thirumanamum inamaanamum

References

External links
  Official biographical sketch in Parliament of India website

Dravida Munnetra Kazhagam politicians
1922 births
Dravidian movement
Indian atheists
2020 deaths
State cabinet ministers of Tamil Nadu
People from Tiruvarur district
India MPs 1967–1970
Lok Sabha members from Tamil Nadu
Annamalai University alumni
Leaders of the Opposition in Tamil Nadu
Tamil Nadu MLAs 1996–2001
Members of the Tamil Nadu Legislative Council
Deaths from multiple organ failure
Madras MLAs 1957–1962
Tamil Nadu MLAs 1985–1989